Dangerous Waters is a 1995 Norwegian action film directed by Lars Berg.

References

External links 

1995 films
1995 action films
Norwegian action films
1990s Norwegian-language films